Mitch's Greatest Hits is an album by Mitch Miller, The Gang and Orchestra. It was released in 1961 on the Columbia label (catalog nos. CL-1544 and CS-8638). The album debuted on Billboard magazine's popular albums chart on March 6, 1961, peaked at No. 9, and remained on that chart for eight weeks.

AllMusic later gave the album a rating of three-and-a-half stars. Reviewer Bruce Eder called the album "fun in its dorky '50s way" and "compelling in its exuberance."

Track listing
Side 1
 "March from The River Kwai & Colonel Bogey" [2:21]
 "The Yellow Rose Of Texas" [3:00]
 "Sing Along" [2:43]
 "The Bowery Grenadiers" [2:21]
 "Song For A Summer Night" [3:08]
 "Silly Little Tune" [2:03]

Side 2
 "The Children's Marching Song" [2:47]
 "Do-Re-Mi" [2:01]
 "Hey, Betty Martin" [2:33]
 "Bonnie Eloise" [3:01]
 "Walkin' Down To Washington" [2:28]
 "Hey Little Baby" [2:01]

References

1961 albums
Columbia Records albums
Mitch Miller albums